"The Man Who Was Almost a Man", also known as "Almos' a Man", is a short story by Richard Wright. It was originally published in 1940 in Harper's Bazaar magazine, and again in 1961 as part of Wright's compilation Eight Men. The story centers on Dave, a young African-American farm worker who is struggling to declare his identity in the atmosphere of the rural South. The story was adapted into a 1976 film starring LeVar Burton.

Plot summary
Dave the main character is ‘almost a man’ but is not quite there yet, both because he is too young and lacking in his independence, and because he is not comfortable with his masculinity (or lack thereof). 

The story begins with the protagonist Dave Sanders walking home from work, irritated with the way he has been treated. Dave works for a farmer on a cattle farm and as he walks across the fields, he begins thinking of ways that will prove to the other workers that he is a grown-up. He decides that the perfect way to prove that he is a grown-up is to purchase a gun. Instead of going home, he goes over to a local store to have a look at the guns in a Sears Roebuck catalog. When he enters the store, Dave encounters the owner Fat Joe. Dave requests the catalog, leading Joe to ask him if he is planning on buying something. Dave responds with a “yessuh,” so Joe then inquires whether or not Dave's ma is letting him have his own money now, to which Dave responds with a “[s]hucks. Mistah Joe, Ahm gittin t' be a man like anybody else,”! Joe asks what exactly it is Dave is planning on buying; a question Dave is reluctant to answer unless Joe promises not to say anything. Joe promises and Dave tells him he's looking to purchase a cannonball; Joe states that Dave “ain’t nothing but a boy,” and that he does not need a gun, but if he's going to buy one, he might as well buy it from him and not from some catalog. Joe offers to sell Dave a left-hand Wheeler, fully loaded and in working order for only two dollars if he can get the money from his ma. With his excitement and interest aroused, Dave leaves the store vowing to come back for the gun later.

When he gets home his mother awaits him, irritated because he has kept supper waiting. Dave sits down at the table with the borrowed catalog until his mother takes it from him, threatening to make it outhouse material if he does not get up and wash. After explaining that it was not his she gives it back to him only to have him fumble through it all throughout dinner. Dave was so infatuated with the catalog that he did not even notice his food was in front of him, or that his father had spoken to him. He determines that if he was going to get the pistol that he had better ask his mother for the money and not his father because his father would instantaneously say no, whereas his mother might be a little easier to persuade.

Upon the completion of supper, Dave finally builds up enough tenacity to approach his mother with his inquiry. He starts the conversation by asking if his boss, Mr. Hawkins, had paid her for the work he had accomplished on the plantation. His mother responds that she has received the money but that it was to be saved in order to buy clothes for the winter. Dave presents to her his proposition, and she responds by saying, “[g]it outta here! Don yuh talk t' me bout no gun! Yuh a fool!" Dave persuades her by stating that the family needs a gun and that if he bought it he would surrender it to his father. Despite her better judgment, Mrs. Sanders agrees to give Dave the two dollars he needs as long as he promises that as soon as the pistol is in his possession, he will bring it straight home and turn it over to her.

Dave runs out the door with the money and purchases the pistol from Joe. On his way home he stops in the fields to play with the gun, only he is unsure of how to use it so he just points and pretends to be shooting imaginary objects. When he arrives at his house, he breaks his promise and does not surrender the gun, instead, he hides it under his pillow, and when his mother comes to retrieve it he claims to have hidden it outside. Dave wakes and with the gun in his hands thinks to himself that he now has the power to “kill anybody, black or white.” He ties the pistol to his leg with a piece of flannel and leaves the house early so he can go unnoticed and not have to give up the gun.

Dave arrives at work early so Mr. Hawkins tells him to hook up Jenny, the mule, and go plow the fields located near the woods. Dave is delighted with the request because it meant he would be so far away from everyone else that he could practice his shooting, and no one would hear. When he gets out to the woods, Dave plows two rows then takes his gun out to show Jenny, he waves the gun around then closes his eyes and take his first shot. The gun flies back in Dave's hand and scares away the mule. When he catches up to her, he realizes that Jenny has been shot and he tries repeatedly to plug the hole with handfuls of “damp black earth.” Jenny eventually dies.

By sunset, Jenny's body is found, and Dave is questioned by both his parents and Mr. Hawkins about what happened. Dave lies about the incident stating that something was wrong with Jenny causing her to fall on the point of the plow. His mother knows this is a lie and insist Dave tell the truth. In tears, Dave confesses but lies yet again when asked what he has done with the gun. Mr. Hawkins tells Dave that although it was an accident, he will pay two dollars a month until he has paid fifty dollars to replace the mule.

That night, Dave feels annoyed at having to pay back Mr. Hawkins for the next two years, and even more annoyed with the fact that people view him as a child more now than ever before. He decides to leave his house and retrieve the gun in which he had buried, not thrown in a river as he claimed. He forces himself to fire the gun with his eyes open until he empties it. In the distance, Dave hears a train, which he approaches and hops in the hopes that this will at last prove he is indeed a man.

Characters
Dave Saunders (protagonist): Dave Saunders, a young African American male, works the duration of his summer vacation plowing fields on a plantation. Trapped in the years of adolescence, Dave has a hard time convincing those around him that they should view and treat him as a man instead of a boy. In order to clear up any confusion as to what age group he belongs, Dave comes to the conclusion that purchasing a gun will solve all of his problems and at last allow him to be treated in the manner in which he desires. However, Dave's plan backfires on him and ends up inflicting self-humiliation and exposing his immaturity all while blowing any possibility of gaining respect from his elders.
Mr. Saunders (Pa): Mr. Saunders for the most part is a “phantom figure", but when actually present in the story serves as the stern disciplinary of the family. He does not tolerate any nonsense and cares only that Dave gets along with his boss and earns his keep. When he discovers that his son has gone behind his back and purchased a gun that caused havoc at work, he deals with the situation by first smoothing things over with Dave's boss, and then addresses Dave with a threat showing that his son does not take priority over business.
Mrs. Saunders (Ma): Mrs. Saunders, unlike her husband, lies at the opposite end of the disciplinary spectrum in that she is an understanding, less demanding woman. For example, Dave approaches her with the proposition of owning a gun because he knows she will be more likely to consider it than his father and is easier to persuade. Mrs. Saunders hesitates to agree to Dave's proposition because she feels the money could be put to better use, but eventually gives in to him causing her to go against what she knows is right for the sake of her sons happiness.
Fat Joe: Fat Joe owns the local store in which Dave goes to for the Sears Roebuck catalog. He allows Dave to borrow the catalog for the night but states that he feels Dave is “nothing but a boy,” and therefore does not need a gun. Despite his statement that Dave does not need a gun due to his age, Joe suggests that if Dave was going to purchase a gun that he should purchase one from him. He presents Dave with a loaded left-hand Wheeler, selling it to him for just two dollars.
Jim Hawkins: Jim employs Dave and owns the plantation that he works on. When Dave wreaks havoc in the fields Mr. Hawkins does not take his job from him or threaten him in any way, but instead comes up with a fair payment plan for Dave to follow in order to undo the damage he had done, showing that he is a rather reasonable man. However, despite his kindness towards him, Dave still resents Mr. Hawkins and the supremacy he possesses.
Jenny: Jenny the mule, owned by Jim Hawkins, works alongside Dave in the fields of the plantation. One day while on the outskirts of the woods with Dave, Jenny suffers an accidental injury and eventually dies a slow death due to a gunshot wound inflicted by none other than Dave himself.

Symbolism of the gun
For the character Dave, the gun seems to symbolize several things, including the achievement of power or control, independence, maturity, and masculinity. For the reader, the gun is more of a symbol of Dave's struggle and failure to achieve his aspirations. The author tells us, “Dave felt he wasn’t a man without a gun.”

On his way home from work, Dave struggled to find a way to prove to everyone that he is no longer a boy. He appeared to think that buying a gun was the only way to get his point across to those who doubted him. After buying the gun, Dave acted as though he felt more adult and masculine, with a newfound sense of independence. The gun made him feel invincible, as though no one could pass judgment upon him or tell him what to do or harm him in any way.

In the scene where Dave kills Jenny, Dave exposes his immaturity and lack of control by misusing the weapon. Instead of using the gun to kill an animal on an early morning hunting trip as a right of passage, Dave's kill was a result of him “sneaking his gun along with him into the field he is supposed to plow for his boss,” much like a child would do. His misuse of the gun and the killing of the mule demonstrated to those around him that he was in fact still an irresponsible boy. The gun was supposed to have made him an independent adult, but in the end, it simply symbolized his struggle to achieve those goals.

Notes

References
Baym, Nina, ed.. The Norton Anthology of American Literature. Shorter seventh edition. Volume 1. New York: W.W. Norton & Company, 736–747. .
C, Junior. "The Man Who Was Almost a Man," by Richard Wright." Teen Ink. Web. 21 Oct. 2011.<http://www.teenink.com/nonfiction/academic/article/310005/The-Man-Who-was-Almost-a-Man-by-Richard-Wright/>.
Loftis, John E. "Domestic Prey: Richard Wright's Parody of the Hunt Tradition in "The Man Who Was Almost a Man." tripod.com. EBSCO Publishing, 2002. Web. 21 Oct 2011. 
Reilly, John. Richard Wright: The Critical Reception. Ayer Publishing, 1978. 
Wright, Richard. “The Man Who Was Almost a Man.” The Story and Its Writer. Ed. Ann Charters. Compact 8th ed. Boston: Bedford/St. Martin's, 2011. 878–87. Print.

American short stories
African-American short stories
1940 short stories
Short stories by Richard Wright (author)
Short stories adapted into films
World Publishing Company books